{{DISPLAYTITLE:5-HT2B receptor}}

5-Hydroxytryptamine receptor 2B (5-HT2B) also known as serotonin receptor 2B is a protein that in humans is encoded by the HTR2B gene. 5-HT2B is a member of the 5-HT2 receptor family that binds the neurotransmitter serotonin (5-hydroxytryptamine, 5-HT).

Tissue distribution and function 
First discovered in the stomach of rats, 5-HT2B was challenging to characterize initially because of its structural similarity to the other 5-HT2 receptors, particularly 5-HT2C. The 5-HT2 receptors (of which the 5-HT2B receptor is a subtype) mediate many of the central and peripheral physiologic functions of serotonin. Cardiovascular effects include contraction of blood vessels and shape changes in platelets; central nervous system (CNS) effects include neuronal sensitization to tactile stimuli and mediation of some of the effects of hallucinogenic substituted amphetamines. The 5-HT2B receptor is expressed in several areas of the CNS, including the dorsal hypothalamus, frontal cortex, medial amygdala, and meninges. However, it is most important role is in the peripheral nervous system (PNS) where it maintains the viability and efficiency of the cardiac valve leaflets.

The 5-HT2B receptor subtype is involved in:
 CNS: inhibition of serotonin and dopamine uptake, behavioural effects
 Vascular: pulmonary vasoconstriction
 Cardiac: The 5-HT2B receptor regulates cardiac structure and functions, as demonstrated by the abnormal cardiac development observed in 5-HT2B receptor null mice. Excessive stimulation of this receptor causes pathological proliferation of cardiac valve fibroblasts, with chronic overstimulation leading to valvulopathy. These receptors are also overexpressed in human failing heart and antagonists of 5-HT2B receptors were uncovered  to prevent both angiotensin II or beta-adrenergic agonist-induced pathological cardiac hypertrophy in mouse.
 Serotonin transporter: 5-HT2B receptors regulate serotonin release via the serotonin transporter, and are important both to normal physiological regulation of serotonin levels in blood plasma, and with the abnormal acute serotonin release produced by drugs such as MDMA. Surprisingly however 5-HT2B receptor activation appears to be protective against the development of serotonin syndrome following elevated extracellular serotonin levels, despite its role in modulating serotonin release.

Clinical significance 

5-HT2B receptors have been strongly implicated in causing drug-induced valvular heart disease. The Fen-Phen scandal in the 80s and 90s revealed the cardiotoxic effects of 5-HT2B stimulation.  Today, 5-HT2B agonism is considered a toxicity signal precluding further clinical development of a compound.

Ligands
The structure of the 5-HT2B receptor was resolved in a complex with the valvulopathogenic drug ergotamine. As of 2009, few highly selective 5-HT2B receptor ligands have been discovered, although numerous potent non-selective compounds are known, particularly agents with concomitant 5-HT2C binding. Research in this area has been limited due to the cardiotoxicity of 5-HT2B agonists, and the lack of clear therapeutic application for 5-HT2B antagonists, but there is still a need for selective ligands for scientific research.

Agonists
Selective
 BW-723C86: fair functional subtype selectivity; almost full agonist. Anxiolytic in vivo.
 Ro60-0175 functionally selective over 5-HT2A, potent agonist at both 5-HT2B/C
 VER-3323: selective for 5-HT2B/C over 5-HT2A
 α-Methyl-5-HT - moderately selective over 5-HT2A/C
 6-APB
 LY-266,097 - biased partial agonist in favor of Gq protein, no β-arrestin2 recruitment

Non-selective
 Guanfacine - an α2A agonist, but has 5-HT2B agonistic activity at therapeutic concentrations.
 MDMA
 MDA
 MEM
 Pergolide
 Cabergoline
 Norfenfluramine
 Chlorphentermine
 Aminorex
 Bromo-dragonfly
 DMT
 5-MeO-DMT
 LSD - About equal affinity for human cloned 5-HT2B and 5-HT2A receptors.
 psilocin
Xylometazoline
Oxymetazoline
Quinidine
Ropinirole
Fenoldopam
Lorcaserin
Methylergonovine
Ergotamine
Ergonovine

Antagonists
 Agomelatine - primarily a melatonin Mt1/Mt2 receptor agonist, with a less potent antagonism of 5-HT2B and 5-HT2C.
 Amisulpride
 Aripiprazole
Cariprazine
 Clozapine
Cyproheptadine
mCPP (in humans)
 Sarpogrelate: a mixed 5-HT2A/B antagonist
 Lisuride: a dopamine agonist of the ergoline class, that is also a 5-HT2B antagonist and a dual 5-HT2A/C agonist
 Tegaserod: primarily a 5-HT4 agonist, but also a 5-HT2B antagonist
 RS-127,445: high affinity; subtype selective (1000x), selective over at least eight other 5-HTR types; orally bioavailable.
Metadoxine: a 5-HT2B antagonist and GABA-activity modulator 
 SDZ SER-082: a mixed 5-HT2B/C antagonist
Promethazine
 EGIS-7625: high selectivity over 5-HT2A
 PRX-08066
 SB-200,646
 SB-204,741
 SB-206,553: mixed 5-HT2B/C antagonist and PAM at α7 nAChR
 SB-215,505
 SB-228,357
Terguride is an oral, potent antagonist of 5-HT2A and 5-HT2B receptors.
 LY-266,097
 LY-272,015

Possible applications
5-HT2B antagonists have previously been proposed as treatment for migraine headaches, and RS-127,445 was trialled in humans up to Phase I for this indication, but development was not continued. More recent research has focused on possible application of 5-HT2B antagonists as treatments for chronic heart disease. Research claims serotonin 5-HT2B receptors have effect on liver regeneration. Antagonism of 5-HT2B may attenuate fibrogenesis and improve liver function in disease models in which fibrosis is pre-established and progressive.

See also 
 5-HT receptor

References

Further reading

External links 
 
 
 

Serotonin receptors